Kremenchug-Konstantinovskoye is a rural locality (a selo) in the Baksansky District in the Kabardino-Balkar Republic, Russia. Population: 

Kremenchug-Konstantinovskoye has the longest place name in Russia without spaces.

See also
List of long place names

References

Rural localities in Kabardino-Balkaria